Grenada competed in the 2014 Commonwealth Games in Glasgow, Scotland from 23 July to 3 August 2014. Kirani James won Grenada's first ever gold medal.

Medalists

Athletics

Men
Track & road events

Combined events – Decathlon

Women
Track & road events

Key
Note–Ranks given for track events are within the athlete's heat only
Q = Qualified for the next round
q = Qualified for the next round as a fastest loser or, in field events, by position without achieving the qualifying target
NR = National record
N/A = Round not applicable for the event

Boxing

Men

Swimming

Men

Women

See also
Grenada at the Commonwealth Games

References

Nations at the 2014 Commonwealth Games
Grenada at the Commonwealth Games
2014 in Grenadian sport